Kakia (Ancient Greek: Κακίαν) (meaning bad and evil), the Greek goddess of vice and moral badness, abominations (presumably, sin or crime), was depicted as a vain, plump, and heavily made-up woman dressed in revealing clothes. She was presented as the opposite of Areté, goddess of excellence and virtue.

According to Gnostics, Kakia is believed to be the child of the first angel and Authadia. Her siblings were Zelos (emulation), Phthonus (envy), Erinnys (fury), and Epithymia (lust).

Kakia tried to tempt many people to become evil, but her most famous temptation was that of Heracles (a.k.a. Hercules), one of the most famous divine heroes in Greek mythology. She offered him a pleasant and easy life, devoid of hardships whereas Arete offered a glorious life but where work and effort would be needed. Heracles saw Kakia's true colours when she revealed her name and thus the meaning of it in the below conversation:

See also 
 Hercules at the crossroads

Mentions of evil, wickedness, depravity, malice in the New Testament 
 Matthew 6:34
 Acts 8:22
 Romans 1:29
 1 Corinthians 5:8
 1 Corinthians 14:20
 Ephesians 4:31
 Colossians 3:8
 Titus 3:3
 James 1:21
 1 Peter 2:1
 1 Peter 2:16

References

Greek goddesses
Personifications in Greek mythology
Evil goddesses
Gnostic deities